Vinotemp is a wine storage manufacturing company specializing in customization. It is a full-service manufacturer of wood wine cabinets, wine racking, wine cooling systems, and a distributor of appliance style wine cellars.

History

The company was founded in 1985 in Los Angeles, California by Francis Ravel. Ravel started out by making and selling his own wine before transitioning into making wine cabinets.

In 1993, Ravel created a Wine-Mate cooling unit, which was the first one of its kind in the industry to be approved by UL (safety organization).

In 2005 India Ravel-Hynes became CEO of Vinotemp. Hynes developed patents for the design and function of different wine storage products.

While the custom wine storage assortment were manufactured in Los Angeles, Vinotemp opened an office in, Irvine, California, in 2011, to allow for an administrative expansion of accounting as well as design and marketing.

In 2012, Vinotemp introduced its product the Wine-Mate Customizable Wine Cooling System, the wine storage industry's first fully customizable cellar cooling system. Currently, Vinotemp manufacturers its wood cabinets in the U.S., while its metal coolers are made in Europe and China.

In 2016, Vinotemp was ranked #44 in Orange County Business Journal's prestigious list of top women-owned businesses in Orange County.

Brands
Vinotemp currently owns the brands Epicureanist, Element, Wine-Mate, Cellartec, Apex (a high-end wine rack manufacturer that Vinotemp purchased in 2010), and Sonoma Wine Hardware.

References 

Wine packaging and storage
Companies based in Irvine, California
American companies established in 1985